Rodelindo Román is a Chilean Football club, their home town is San Joaquín, Santiago. They currently play in the third level of Chilean football, the Segunda División.

The club were founded on November 16, 1956 and participated for 1 year in Tercera División A and 2 year in Cuarta División.

It was the first club of midfielder Arturo Vidal, who became its owner in 2016.

Seasons
1 season in Segunda División
1 season in Tercera A
2 season in Tercera B

Players

Current squad

Titles
 Tercera B: 2019

See also 
 Chilean football league system

References

External links 

Football clubs in Chile
Association football clubs established in 1956
1956 establishments in Chile